Tsuchi may refer to: 
Chuxi tulou group, a group of earthen structures in Fujian Province
Di (Chinese concept) (地), Japanese character for Earth
Tsuchi (film), a 1939 film directed by Tomu Uchida